The men's lightweight event was part of the boxing programme at the 1976 Summer Olympics. The weight class allowed boxers of up to 60 kilograms to compete. The competition was held from 18 to 31 July 1976. 23 boxers from 23 nations competed.

Medalists

Results
The following boxers took part in the event:

First round
 Roberto Andino (PUR) def. Gaetano Pirastu (ITA), 5:0
 Ace Rusevski (YUG) def. Gerard Hamill (IRL), 4:1

Second round
 Nelson Calzadilla (VEN) def. Ernesto Gonzalez (NIC), 5:0
 Simion Cuțov (ROM) def. Sylvester Mittee (GBR), RSC-3
 Rashad Abdelgaffar Zaki (EGY) – Lewrence Obagoriola (NGA), both walk-over
 Ove Lundby (SWE) def. Newton Chisanga (ZAM), walk-over
 Bogdan Gajda (POL) def. Cleveland Denny (GUY), walk-over
 Vassily Solomin (URS) def. Hans Henrik Palm (DEN), 5:0
 Georgios Agrimavakis (GRE) def. Bechir Jilassi (TUN), walk-over
 András Botos (HUN) def. David Ssensonjo (UGA), walk-over
 Leonidas Asprilla (COL) def. Balcha Degefu (ETH), walk-over
 Howard Davis (USA) def. Yukio Segawa (JPN), 5:0
 Tsvetan Tsvetkov (BUL) def. Khaidav Altanhuiag (MGL), 5:0
 Parviz Bahmani (IRN) def. Nasreddin El-Agely (LIB), walk-over
 Yves Jeudy (HAI) def. David Oleme (CMR), walk-over
 Abderrahim Souihi (MAR) – Kwami Ayigan (TOG), both walk-over
 Reinaldo Valiente (CUB) def. Antonio Rubio (ESP), 5:0
 Ace Rusevski (YUG) def. Roberto Andino (PUR), RSC-3

Third round
 Simion Cuțov (ROM) def. Nelson Calzadilla (VEN), 5:0
 Ove Lundby (SWE) – no opponent (bye)
 Vassily Solomin (URS) def. Bogdan Gajda (POL), 5:0
 András Botos (HUN) def. Georgios Agrimavakis (GRE), 4:1
 Howard Davis (USA) def. Leonidas Asprilla (COL), RSC-2
 Tsvetan Tsvetkov (BUL) def. Parviz Bahmani (IRN), 5:0
 Yves Jeudy (HAI) – no opponent (bye)
 Ace Rusevski (YUG) def. Reinaldo Valiente (CUB), 5:0

Quarterfinals
 Simion Cuțov (ROM) def. Ove Lundby (SWE), 5:0
 Vassily Solomin (URS) def. András Botos (HUN), 5:0
 Howard Davis (USA) def. Tsvetan Tsvetkov (BUL), RSC-3
 Ace Rusevski (YUG) def. Yves Jeudy (HAI), RSC-2

Semifinals
 Simion Cuțov (ROM) def. Vassily Solomin (URS), 5:0
 Howard Davis (USA) def. Ace Rusevski (YUG), 5:0

Final
 Howard Davis (USA) def. Simion Cuțov (ROM), 5:0

References

Lightweight